This is a list of public art in the English town of Reading. This list applies only to works of art accessible in an outdoor public space. For example, this does not include artwork  visible inside a museum.

References

External links 
Public Works of Art in Reading from the Trooper Potts VC Memorial Site via the Internet Archive

Reading, Berkshire
English art
Reading, Berkshire